Josefa is a given name. Notable people with the name include:

 Infanta Francisca Josefa of Portugal (1699-1736), last of eight children of King Peter II of Portugal and his second wife Marie Sophie of Neuburg
 Infanta Maria Josefa of Spain (1744-1801), Princess of Naples and Sicily
 María Josefa García Granados (1796-1848), Guatemalan writer
 María Josefa Lastiri (1792-1846), First Lady of the Federal Republic of Central America
 María Josefa Pimentel, Duchess of Osuna (1752-1834), Spanish aristocrat
 María Luisa Josefa (1866-1937), Mexican Roman Catholic nun
 Josefa Acevedo de Gomez (1803-1861), Colombian novelist
 Josefa Bayeu (18th century), wife of Francisco Goya
 Josefa Berens-Totenohl (1891-1969), German writer
 Josefa de Godoy di Bassano, 2nd Viscountess of Rocafuerte (1834-1882), Spanish-Italian aristocrat
 Josefa de Óbidos (1630-1684), Spanish-Portuguese painter
 Josefa de Tudó, 1st Countess of Castillo Fiel (1779-1869), mistress of Manuel de Godoy
 Josefa Dimuri (21st century), Fijian politician
Josefa González Blanco Ortiz Mena (born 1965), Mexican ecologist and politician
 Josefa Idem (born 1964), West German-Italian sprint canoeist
 Josefa Iloilo (born 1920), President of Fiji
 Josefa Köster (born 1918), West German sprint canoeist
 Josefa Llanes Escoda (circa 1898-1945), National Executive of the Girl Scouts of the Philippines
 Josefa Martín Luengo (1944-2009), Spanish educator
 Josefa Moe (1933-2006), American entertainer
 Josefa Ordonez (1728-fl. 1792), Mexican actress and courtesan
 Josefa Ortiz de Domínguez (1768-1829), supporter of the Mexican War of Independence
 Josefa Rika (born 1987), Fijian cricketer
 Josefa Vosanibola (21st century), Fijian politician

Feminine given names
German feminine given names
Spanish feminine given names